Gem-associated protein 6 is a protein that in humans is encoded by the GEMIN6 gene. The gem-associated proteins are those found in the gems of Cajal bodies.

Function 

GEMIN6 is part of a large macromolecular complex, the SMN localized to both the cytoplasm and the nucleus, that plays a role in the cytoplasmic assembly of small nuclear ribonucleoproteins (snRNPs). Other members of this complex include SMN (MIM 600354), GEMIN2 (SIP1; MIM 602595), GEMIN3 (DDX20; MIM 606168), GEMIN4 (MIM 606969), and GEMIN5 (MIM 607005).[supplied by OMIM]

Interactions 

Gem-associated protein 6 has been shown to interact with gem-associated protein 7.

References

Further reading